= 9/5 =

9/5 may refer to:

- September 5 (month-day date notation)
- May 9 (day-month date notation)
